A loving cup is a shared drinking container traditionally used at weddings and banquets. It usually has two handles and is often made of silver. Loving cups are often given as trophies to winners of games or competitions.

Background

Loving cups found in several European cultures, including the Celtic quaich and the French .

The Russian bratina ("fraternity cup" or "brotherhood cup") is a wine bowl also used for banquets. It is considered the "Russian version of the loving cup". It is often without handles.

See also
The Emperor, a loving cup
Lovespoon

References

Award items
Drinkware
Wedding objects